Useless is the debut EP by American nu metal band Ünloco, released on April 25, 2000 via Captiva Records. All the songs from the release appeared on the band's major label debut Healing (albeit remastered), with the song "I" changed to the title "Nothing".

Track listing
 Naive – 3:27
 Less Of – 4:25
 Panic – 4:00
 I – 2:33
 Useless – 5:02
 Clean – 4:45 
 Soul  - 7:44

2000 debut EPs
Ünloco albums